"When the Fires Come" is a single by Kero Kero Bonito, from the EP Civilisation I.

Music video
The official video for the song was released on 9 September 2019 and uploaded to YouTube. It was directed by James Hankins. The video revolves around the band members going on an adventure around the world.

Release history

References

2019 singles
2019 songs
Kero Kero Bonito songs